Broussard is a surname.

Broussard may also refer to:
 Broussard, Louisiana, a city in the United States
 Broussard's, a restaurant in New Orleans, Louisiana
 Max Holste Broussard, a utility aircraft